Jean Desfontaines (c. 1658 – after 1752) was a French Baroque composer.

Desfontaines was a pupil of Monsieur de Sainte-Colombe. He was a prolific music teacher in Paris, however, it does not seem that he held a public office.

Works
His output includes airs, the cantata Narcisse, the pastorale Le Désespoir de Tircis and sacred music, which consists of 192 works numbered JeD. 1 to JeD. 192. He wrote music on all 150 psalms, a magnificat Anima mea and 41 petits motets on liturgical texts of Neo-Latin poetry.

External links
Introduction to the catalogue of motets by Jean Desfontaines  

French male classical composers
French Baroque composers
1650s births
18th-century deaths
18th-century classical composers
French composers of sacred music
18th-century French composers
18th-century French male musicians
Year of birth uncertain
Year of death unknown
17th-century male musicians